Stillwater Cove Regional Park is a regional park north of Jenner, California, U.S.A. that is maintained by the Sonoma County Regional Parks Department. It is located near the mouth of Stockhoff Creek. Access is by means of State Route 1. It was one of the filming locations for 20th Century Fox's 1947 fantasy film, The Ghost and Mrs. Muir.

Facilities and features
The park features beach access, a historic schoolhouse, and views of the Pacific Ocean. It also offers campsites, picnic facilities, hiking, and day use parking. It has a launch area for small boats, and is popular with divers, including abalone divers. Its restrooms have flush toilets, showers, and electrical outlets.

See also
 Sonoma Coast State Beach
 Stillwater Cove
 List of beaches in Sonoma County, California
 List of California state parks
 List of Sonoma County Regional Parks facilities

References

External links

Parks in Sonoma County, California
Regional parks in California
San Francisco Bay Area beaches
Beaches of Sonoma County, California
Beaches of Northern California